, or , is a Japanese group of supermarkets, shopping centers and department stores, headquartered in Akabane (赤羽), Kita, Tokyo.

History
The group was established in December 1946, and was formed in 1956 by Seibu Department Stores, a group company of Seibu Railway. In 1980, Seiyu launched its private brand Mujirushi-Ryōhin (commonly known as MUJI outside Japan). MUJI was transferred to the Ryohin Keikaku Company in 1990, and is no longer part of Seiyu.

On December 31, 2003, Seiyu and the US retail chain Walmart signed a partnership agreement in which Walmart would teach global supply chain practices. Numazu, Shizuoka was the site of the first Seiyu store using Walmart methods.

Walmart bought a 37 percent stake in Seiyu in 2003, and according to a company press release, in late 2005, Walmart acquired a majority stake in the company, which it has since increased to 100% ownership in 2008.

Previously, the company had a registered office in Higashi-Ikebukuro, Toshima, Tokyo.

In 2019, Walmart named Lionel Desclée, formerly of Delhaize and the Belgian pet shop chain Tom&Co, president and CEO of both Seiyu and Walmart Japan. In remarks after his appointment, he said Walmart had no interest in selling Seiyu. However, that June, Walmart outlined plans to relist Seiyu on the stock market.

Over the 2019-2020 period, Seiyu comparative-store sales grew 180 basis points faster than the market and EBITDA increased by nearly 40%. In addition, Rakuten Seiyu Netsuper, jointly operated by Seiyu and Rakuten, recorded a nearly 40% year-on-year increase in gross merchandise sales in the fourth quarter of 2020.

In 2020, Walmart announced they would be selling 65% of their shares in the company to private-equity firm KKR in a deal valuing 329 stores and 34,600 employees at $1.6 billion. Walmart is supposed to retain 15% and a seat on the board, while Japanese e-commerce giant Rakuten Inc. will receive 20%.

Past Regional Expansion Plans
In addition to its Japanese operations, Seiyu also had department stores operating under its name in Singapore and Hong Kong. The group used to directly operate these stores, but in October 2005, its three Singapore stores were sold to CapitaLand Limited, which transferred them to Beijing Hualian Group later the same year. The group's Hong Kong store in New Town Plaza, Sha Tin was sold to Sun Hung Kai Properties Limited in June 2005, but like the stores in Singapore, continued to operate under the Seiyu name until April 2008. The Singapore stores were then renamed BHG, which stands for "Beijing Hualian Group".

Group companies
Seiyu Group refers to an association of companies, of which The Seiyu, Ltd. is the parent. The companies in Seiyu Group are:
The Seiyu, Ltd.
Hokkaido Seiyu Co., Ltd.
Tohoku Seiyu Co., Ltd.
S.S.V. Inc.
Kyushu Seiyu Co., Ltd.
Sunny Co., Ltd.
Wakana Co., Ltd.
Smile Corp.
The SCC, Ltd.
Nicoh Inc.
Nijicom Ltd.
Smis Co., Ltd.
Seiyu Service Co., Ltd.

References

Further information
 - About Walmart's ownership of Seiyu Group

External links

 

Retail companies established in 1946
Retail companies based in Tokyo
Department stores of Japan
Walmart
Supermarkets of Japan
Conglomerate companies based in Tokyo
Japanese companies established in 1946
2008 mergers and acquisitions
Japanese subsidiaries of foreign companies
2020 mergers and acquisitions
Kohlberg Kravis Roberts companies
Rakuten